The 2014 Swedish Open was a tennis tournament played on outdoor clay courts as part of the ATP World Tour 250 Series of the 2014 ATP World Tour and as part of the International Series on the 2014 WTA Tour. It took place in Båstad, Sweden, from 7 through 13 July 2014 for the men's tournament, and from 14 through 20 July 2014 for the women's tournament. It was also known as the 2014 SkiStar Swedish Open for the men and the 2014 Collector Swedish Open for the women for sponsorship reasons. It was the 67th edition of the event for the men and the 6th edition for the women.

Points and prize money

Point distribution

Prize money

ATP singles main-draw entrants

Seeds 

 1 Rankings are as of June 23, 2014

Other entrants 
The following players received wildcards into the singles main draw:
  Markus Eriksson
  Christian Lindell
  Elias Ymer

The following players received entry from the qualifying draw:
  Radu Albot
  Iñigo Cervantes
  Renzo Olivo
  Albert Ramos Viñolas

Withdrawals 
Before the tournament
  Nicolás Almagro
  Łukasz Kubot

Retirements 
  Jerzy Janowicz
  Paul-Henri Mathieu (illness)
  Pere Riba (neck injury)

ATP doubles main-draw entrants

Seeds 

 Rankings are as of June 23, 2014

Other entrants 
The following pairs received wildcards into the doubles main draw:
  Isak Arvidsson /  Markus Eriksson
  Daniel Windahl /  Elias Ymer
The following pair received entry as alternates:
  Dustin Brown /  Dušan Lajović

Withdrawals 
Before the tournament
  Pere Riba (neck injury)

WTA singles main-draw entrants

Seeds 

 1 Rankings are as of July 7, 2014

Other entrants 
The following players received wildcards into the singles main draw:
  Sofia Arvidsson
  Alizé Cornet
  Rebecca Peterson

The following players received entry from the qualifying draw:
  Gabriela Dabrowski
  Richèl Hogenkamp
  Anett Kontaveit
  Tereza Martincová
  Yulia Putintseva
  Laura Siegemund

Withdrawals 
Before the tournament
  Vania King
  Yvonne Meusburger
  Paula Ormaechea
  Flavia Pennetta
  Carla Suárez Navarro
  Serena Williams
  Barbora Záhlavová-Strýcová

Retirements 
  Irina-Camelia Begu (right thigh injury)
  Teliana Pereira (right knee injury)

WTA doubles main-draw entrants

Seeds 

 1 Rankings are as of July 7, 2014

Other entrants 
The following pairs received wildcards into the doubles main draw:
  Sofia Arvidsson /  Hilda Melander
  Johanna Larsson /  Rebecca Peterson

Withdrawals 
During the tournament
  Teliana Pereira (right knee injury)

Champions

Men's singles 

  Pablo Cuevas def.  João Sousa, 6–2, 6–1

Women's singles 

  Mona Barthel def.  Chanelle Scheepers, 6–3, 7–6(7–3)

Men's doubles 

  Johan Brunström /  Nicholas Monroe def.  Jérémy Chardy /  Oliver Marach, 4–6, 7–6(7–5), [10–7]

Women's doubles 

   Andreja Klepač /  María Teresa Torró Flor def.  Jocelyn Rae /  Anna Smith, 6–1, 6–1

References

External links 
 

Swedish Open
Swedish Open
Swedish Open
Swedish Open
Swedish Open